Enzacamene (INN; also known as 4-methylbenzylidene camphor or 4-MBC) is an organic camphor derivative that is used in the cosmetic industry for its ability to protect the skin against UV, specifically UV B radiation. As such, it is used in sunscreen lotions and other skincare products claiming a SPF value. Its tradenames include Eusolex 6300 (Merck) and Parsol 5000 (DSM).

Mechanism
All the camphor-derived sunscreens dissipate the photon energy by cis-trans isomerisation. However, for enzacamene the quantum yield for this isomerization is only between 0.13-0.3. This low quantum yield means that other photochemical processes are also occurring.

Endocrine disruptor
Studies have raised the issue that enzacamene acts as an endocrine disruptor. There is controversy about the estrogenic effects of enzacamene and while one study showed only a relatively minor effect. In addition, there is some evidence that enzacamene may suppress the pituitary-thyroid axis, leading to hypothyroidism.

Approval status
Enzacamene is approved in Canada by Health Canada. It is not approved for use in the United States by the Food and Drug Administration and it is not permitted in Japan nor in Denmark.

See also
Xenoestrogen

References

Sunscreening agents
Enones
4-Tolyl compounds